Wang Zongyuan (born 24 October 2001) is a Chinese diver.

Wang competed in the 2019 World Aquatics Championships and won gold in the 1 metre springboard. He also competed at the Tokyo 2020 Summer Olympics and won gold in the Men's 3m synchro event and the silver in the 3m springboard.

References

2001 births
Living people
Chinese male divers
World Aquatics Championships medalists in diving
Place of birth missing (living people)
Olympic divers of China
Divers at the 2020 Summer Olympics
Medalists at the 2020 Summer Olympics
Olympic medalists in diving
Olympic gold medalists for China
Olympic silver medalists for China
21st-century Chinese people